The Penrose–Lucas argument is a logical argument partially based on a theory developed by mathematician and logician Kurt Gödel. In 1931, he proved that every effectively generated theory capable of proving basic arithmetic either fails to be  consistent or fails to be complete. Mathematician Roger Penrose modified the argument in his first book on consciousness, The Emperor's New Mind (1989), where he used it to provide the basis of the theory of orchestrated objective reduction.

Background
Gödel showed that any such theory also including a statement of its own consistency is inconsistent. A key element of the proof is the use of Gödel numbering to construct a "Gödel sentence" for the theory, which encodes a statement of its own incompleteness, e.g. "This theory can't prove this statement." Either this statement and its negation are both unprovable (the theory is incomplete) or both provable (the theory is inconsistent). In the first eventuality the statement is intuitively true (since it is not provable); otherwise, the statement is intuitively false - though provable. An analogous statement has been used to show that humans are subject to the same limits as machines.

Penrose argued that while a formal proof system cannot prove its own consistency, Gödel-unprovable results are provable by human mathematicians. He takes this disparity to mean that human mathematicians are not describable as formal proof systems, and are therefore running a non-computable algorithm. Similar claims about the implications of Gödel's theorem were originally espoused by Turing in the late 1940s (only in order to confute them), by E. Nagel and J.R. Newman in 1958, and were subsequently popularized by the philosopher John Lucas of Merton College, Oxford in 1961.

Consequences
If correct, the Penrose–Lucas argument creates a need to understand the physical basis of non-computable behaviour in the brain. Most physical laws are computable, and thus algorithmic. However, Penrose determined that wave function collapse was a prime candidate for a non-computable process.

In quantum mechanics, particles are treated differently from the objects of classical mechanics. Particles are described by wave functions that evolve according to the Schrödinger equation. Non-stationary wave functions are linear combinations of the eigenstates of the system, a phenomenon described by the superposition principle. When a quantum system interacts with a classical system—i.e. when an observable is measured—the system appears to collapse to a random eigenstate of that observable from a classical vantage point.

If collapse is truly random, then no process or algorithm can deterministically predict its outcome. This provided Penrose with a candidate for the physical basis of the non-computable process that he hypothesized to exist in the brain. However, he disliked the random nature of environmentally induced collapse, as randomness was not a promising basis for mathematical understanding. Penrose proposed that isolated systems may still undergo a new form of wave function collapse, which he called objective reduction (OR).

Penrose sought to reconcile general relativity and quantum theory using his own ideas about the possible structure of spacetime. He suggested that at the Planck scale curved spacetime is not continuous, but discrete. Penrose postulated that each separated quantum superposition has its own piece of spacetime curvature, a blister in spacetime. The rough threshold for OR is given by Penrose's indeterminacy principle:

where:
  is the time until OR occurs, 
  is the gravitational self-energy or the degree of spacetime separation given by the superpositioned mass, and
  is the reduced Planck constant. 
Thus, the greater the mass-energy of the object, the faster it will undergo OR and vice versa. Atomic-level superpositions would require 10 million years to reach OR threshold, while an isolated 1 kilogram object would reach OR threshold in 10−37s. Objects somewhere between these two scales could collapse on a timescale relevant to neural processing.

An essential feature of Penrose's theory is that the choice of states when objective reduction occurs is selected neither randomly (as are choices following wave function collapse) nor algorithmically. Rather, states are selected by a "non-computable" influence embedded in the Planck scale of spacetime geometry. Penrose claimed that such information is Platonic, representing pure mathematical truth, aesthetic and ethical values at the Planck scale. This relates to Penrose's ideas concerning the three worlds: physical, mental, and the Platonic mathematical world. In his theory, the Platonic world corresponds to the geometry of fundamental spacetime that is claimed to support noncomputational thinking.

Criticism
The Penrose–Lucas argument about the implications of Gödel's incompleteness theorem for computational theories of human intelligence was criticized by mathematicians, computer scientists, and philosophers, and the consensus among experts in these fields is that the argument fails, with different authors attacking different aspects of the argument.

LaForte pointed out that in order to know the truth of an unprovable Gödel sentence, one must already know the formal system is consistent. Referencing Benacerraf, he then demonstrated that humans cannot prove that they are consistent, and in all likelihood human brains are inconsistent. He pointed to contradictions within Penrose's own writings as examples. Similarly, Minsky argued that because humans can believe false ideas to be true, human mathematical understanding need not be consistent and consciousness may easily have a deterministic basis.

Feferman faulted detailed points in Penrose's second book, Shadows of the Mind. He argued that mathematicians do not progress by mechanistic search through proofs, but by trial-and-error reasoning, insight and inspiration, and that machines do not share this approach with humans. He pointed out that everyday mathematics can be formalized. He also rejected Penrose's Platonism.

Searle criticized Penrose's appeal to Gödel as resting on the fallacy that all computational algorithms must be capable of mathematical description. As a counter-example, Searle cited the assignment of license plate numbers to specific vehicle identification numbers, as part of vehicle registration. According to Searle, no mathematical function can be used to connect a known VIN with its LPN, but the process of assignment is quite simple—namely, "first come, first served"—and can be performed entirely by a computer.

See also
 Orchestrated objective reduction

References

Logic
Arguments
Theorems